The 1972 Oregon State Beavers football team represented Oregon State University in the Pacific-8 Conference (Pac-8) during the 1972 NCAA University Division football season.  In their eighth season under head coach Dee Andros, the Beavers compiled a 2–9 record (1–6 in Pac-8, last), and were outscored 295 to 131.   They played four home games on campus at Parker Stadium in Corvallis, with one at Civic Stadium in Portland.

The loss to rival Oregon was Andros' first setback in the Civil War game, and the Ducks' first win over the Beavers in nine years.

Schedule

Roster
Steve Brown, Sr. (defense)
Craig Fair, Jr. (defense)

References

External links
 Game program: Oregon State at Washington State – October 21, 1972 

Oregon State
Oregon State Beavers football seasons
Oregon State Beavers football